Edward Leilani "Eddie" Kamae (August 4, 1927 – January 7, 2017) was one of the founding members of Sons of Hawaii.  He was a 'ukulele virtuoso, singer, composer, film producer and primary proponent of the Hawaiian Cultural Renaissance.

Biography

Eddie Leilani Kamae was born in Honolulu, Hawaii, and raised both there and in Lahaina, Maui.  His grandmother was a dancer for King David Kalākaua's court.

He learned to play the 'ukulele with an instrument his bus driver brother found on the public transport.  Eddie would sit by the radio and try to play with any rhythm section he was hearing, usually Latin, classical and jazz tunes.  When he was 14 years old, his father would take him to jam sessions where Eddie would get up on stage to play, earning accolades from the audiences who threw money at the performers' feet. Kamae began going to Queen's Surf to listen to the Hawaiian music being played.

Kamae began to teach ukulele.  2006 'Ukulele Hall of Fame Inductee Herb Ohta Sr., also known at Ohta-San, was mentored by Kamae. Kamae died on January 7, 2017, at the age of 89. In addition, he contributed a lot to the influence of Hawaiian music on the rest of the world.

Sons of Hawaii

Kamae was introduced to Gabby Pahinui in 1959, and the slack key virtuoso demonstrated a new way to make the 'ukulele "talk story".  Kamae himself would come to be known for his inventive methods of plucking all four strings simultaneously, playing the chords and melody at the same time. They began playing together and formed Sons of Hawaii, with their first paying gig at The Sand Box.

Film producer

Mary Kawena Pukui and Pilahi Paki became Eddie's first teachers in the Hawaiian language. Eddie began to feel a growing need to teach the Hawaiian culture through music, to pass it along to succeeding generations. Eddie began to chart a new course with his arts.

His 1971 initial meeting with Hawaiian poet Sam Li'a Kalainaina Jr. resulted in Kamae's first documentary in 1988, LI'A: The Legacy of a Hawaiian Man .  Together, Kamae and Li'a wrote Hawaii Pia Valley Song.  Kamae has also produced the documentaries  The Hawaiian Way The Art and Tradition of Slack Key Music (1993)  The History of the Sons of Hawaii (2004),  Words, Earth & Aloha:  Source of Hawaiian Music (2005), Keepers of the Flame (2005)  Lahaina: Waves of Change (2007).

Awards

Discography
Yesterday & Today, Vol. 2 (2009) CD  (Hawaii Sons)
Yesterday & Today (2008)  CD (Hawaii Sons)
This Is Eddie Kamae (2008) CD 1197 (Omagatoki Japan)
Eddie Kamae & Friends (2006) CD 8542 (Hawaii Sons)
Heart of the Ukulele (2004) CD 3002 (Surfside/Mahalo)
Eddie Kamae Presents: The Best of Sons of Hawaii, Vol. 1 (2004) CD (Hawaii Sons)
Eddie Kamae & The Sons of Hawaii (2004) CD (Hawaii Sons)
Christmas Time With Eddie Kamae & Sons of Hawai'i (2004) CD 1014 (Hawaii Sons)
Sons of Hawaii (1998) CD 8516 (Panini)
Music of Old Hawaii (1962) CD Hula

Bibliography

References

External links
Sons of Hawaii Home Page
The Hawaiian Legacy Foundation

1927 births
2017 deaths
Musicians from Honolulu
Native Hawaiian musicians
Hawaiian ukulele players
Native Hawaiian activists
National Heritage Fellowship winners
Na Hoku Hanohano Award winners